Sazali Salleh is a former Singapore international football player who plays for Tanjong Pagar United in the S.League.

Club career
A true journeyman, Sazali has played for 7 clubs in the S-League, namely Home United, Geylang United, Tanjong Pagar United, Balestier Khalsa, Sengkang Punggol, Woodlands Wellington FC and Tampines Rovers.

International career
Sazali has a total of 3 caps for the National Team.

External links

Singaporean footballers
Singapore international footballers
Tanjong Pagar United FC players
Living people
1980 births
Home United FC players
Geylang International FC players
Balestier Khalsa FC players
Woodlands Wellington FC players
Hougang United FC players
Tampines Rovers FC players
Association football midfielders
Singapore Premier League players